An aviation biofuel or bio-jet fuel or bio-aviation fuel (BAF) is a biofuel used to power aircraft and is said to be a sustainable aviation fuel (SAF). The International Air Transport Association (IATA) considers it a key element to reducing the carbon footprint within the environmental impact of aviation. Aviation biofuel could help decarbonize medium- and long-haul air travel generating most emissions, and could extend the life of older aircraft types by lowering their carbon footprint.

Biofuels are biomass-derived fuels from plants or waste; depending on which type of biomass is used, they could lower  emissions by 20–98% compared to conventional jet fuel.

The first test flight using blended biofuel was in 2008,
and in 2011 blended fuels with 50% biofuels were allowed in commercial flights.
In 2019, the IATA was aiming for a 2% penetration by 2025.

Aviation biofuel can be produced from plant sources such as Jatropha, algae, tallows, waste oils, palm oil, Babassu, and Camelina (bio-SPK); from solid biomass using pyrolysis processed with a Fischer–Tropsch process (FT-SPK); with an alcohol-to-jet (ATJ) process from waste fermentation; or from synthetic biology through a solar reactor.
Small piston engines can be modified to burn ethanol.

Sustainable biofuels do not compete with food crops, prime agricultural land, natural forest or fresh water. They are an alternative to electrofuels. Sustainable aviation fuel is certified as being sustainable by a third-party organisation.

Environmental impact

Plants absorb carbon dioxide as they grow, meaning plant-based biofuels emit only the same amount of greenhouse gases as previously absorbed. Biofuel production, processing and transport however emit greenhouse gases, reducing the emissions savings.
Biofuels with most emission savings are those derived from photosynthetic algae (98% savings, technology not yet mature) and from non-food crops and forest residues (91–95% savings).

Jatropha oil, a non-food oil used as a biofuel, should lower  emissions by 50–80% compared to Jet-A1. Jatropha, used for biodiesel, can thrive on marginal land where most plants would produce low crop yields.
A life cycle assessment by the Yale School of Forestry on jatropha, one source of potential biofuels, estimated that using it could reduce greenhouse gas emissions by up to 85% if former agro-pastoral land is used, or increase emissions by up to 60% if natural woodland is converted to use.

Palm oil cultivation is constrained by scarce land resources and its expansion to forestland causes deforestation and biodiversity loss, and direct and indirect emissions due to land-use change. Neste Corporation's renewable products include a refining residue of food-grade palm oil, the oily waste skimmed from the palm oil mill's wastewater. Other Neste sources are UCO (used cooking oil) from deep fryers and animal fats. Neste's sustainable aviation fuel is used by Lufthansa; Air France and KLM announced 2030 SAF targets and announced multi-year purchase contracts totalling over 2.4 million tonnes of SAF from Neste, TotalEnergies and DG Fuels. 

NASA has determined that 50% aviation biofuel mixture can cut particulate emissions caused by air traffic by 50–70%. Biofuels do not contain sulfur compounds and thus do not emit sulfur dioxide.

Timeline

The first flight using blended biofuel took place in 2008. Virgin Atlantic flew the first flight by a commercial airline to be powered partly by biofuel, while commercial biofuel flights were likely to use feedstocks such as algae.
By then, airlines representing more than 15% of the industry formed the Sustainable Aviation Fuel Users Group, with support from NGOs such as Natural Resources Defense Council and The Roundtable For Sustainable Biofuels. They pledged to develop sustainable biofuels for aviation. That year, Boeing was co-chair of the Algal Biomass Organization, joined by air carriers and biofuel technology developer UOP LLC (Honeywell).

In 2009, the IATA committed to achieve carbon-neutral growth by 2020, and to halve carbon emissions by 2050.

In 2010, Boeing targeted of 1% of global aviation fuels by 2015.

By June 2011, the revised Specification for Aviation Turbine Fuel Containing Synthesized Hydrocarbons (ASTM D7566) allowed commercial airlines to blend up to 50% biofuels with conventional jet fuel.
The safety and performance of jet fuel used in passenger flights is certified by ASTM International.
Biofuels were approved for commercial use after a multi-year technical review from aircraft makers, engine manufacturers and oil companies. 
Since then, some airlines have experimented with using biofuels on commercial flights. As of July 2020, there have been published seven annexes to D7566, including as much types of biofuels: Fischer-Tropsch Synthetic Paraffinic Kerosene (FT-SPK, 2009), Hydroprocessed Esters and Fatty Acids Synthetic Paraffinic Kerosene (HEFA-SPK, 2011), Hydroprocessed Fermented Sugars to Synthetic Isoparaffins (HFS-SIP, 2014), Fischer-Tropsch Synthetic Paraffinic Kerosene with Aromatics (FT-SPK/A, 2015), Alcohol to Jet Synthetic Paraffinic Kerosene (ATJ-SPK, 2016), Catalytic Hydrothermolysis Synthesized Kerosene (CH-SK, or CHJ; 2020).

In December 2011, the FAA awarded US$7.7 million to eight companies to develop drop-in sustainable fuels, especially from alcohols, sugars, biomass, and organic matter such as pyrolysis oils, within its  and  programs.

From 2014, Solena planned to turn annually 500,000 tonnes of waste from the City of London that would normally go to landfill into biofuel to be used in the British Airways fleet, but filed for bankruptcy in 2015.

By 2015, cultivation of fatty acid methyl esters and alkenones from the algae, Isochrysis, was under research as a possible jet biofuel feedstock.

By 2016, Thomas Brueck of Munich TU was forecasting that algaculture could provide 3–5% of jetfuel needs by 2050.

In Fall 2016, to achieve its emissions reductions goals, the ICAO planned multiple measures including the development and deployment of sustainable aviation fuels.

By 2017, nor were achieved and most companies had disappeared or changed their business plans to focus on cosmetics supplements, nutraceuticals, pet food additives, animal feed, pigments and speciality oils.

In 2019, 0.1% of fuel was SAF: the International Air Transport Association (IATA) supports the adoption of Sustainable Aviation fuel, aiming in 2019 for a 2% penetration by 2025: .
By then, more than 150,000 flights have used biofuels and five airports have regular biofuel distribution: Bergen, Brisbane, Los Angeles, Oslo and Stockholm, with others offering occasional supply.

That year, Virgin Australia had fueled more than 700 flights and flown more than one million kilometers, domestic and international, using Gevo's alcohol-to-jet fuel.
Gevo is committed to going after the entire gallon of sustainable aviation fuel, potentially leading to a negative carbon footprint. Virgin Atlantic was working to regularly use fuel derived from the waste gases of steel mills, with LanzaTech.
British Airways wanted to convert household waste into jet fuel with Velocys.

From 2020, Qantas will start using a 50/50 blend of SG Preston's biofuel on its Los Angeles-Australia flights, also providing fuel derived from non-food plant oils to JetBlue Airways during 10 years.

By 2020, International Airlines Group had invested $400 million to convert waste into sustainable aviation fuel with Velocys.

In early 2021, Boeing's CEO Dave Calhoun said drop-in sustainable aviation fuels are "the only answer between now and 2050" to reduce carbon emissions.

Production
Jet fuel is a mixture of various hydrocarbons. The range of their sizes (molecular weights or carbon numbers) is restricted by the requirements for the product, for example, freezing point or smoke point. Jet fuels are sometimes classified as kerosene or naphtha-type. Kerosene-type fuels include Jet A, Jet A-1, JP-5 and JP-8. Naphtha-type jet fuels, sometimes referred to as "wide-cut" jet fuel, include Jet B and JP-4.

"Drop-in" biofuels are biofuels that are completely interchangeable with conventional fuels. Deriving "drop-in" jet fuel from bio-based sources is ASTM approved via two routes. ASTM has also found it safe to blend in 50% SPK into regular jet fuels. Only tests have been done so far with blending in synthetic parabareffinic kerosene (SPK) in considerably higher concentrations.

 HEFA-SPK 
 Hydroprocessed Esters and Fatty Acids Synthetic Paraffinic Kerosine (HEFA-SPK) is a specific type of hydrotreated vegetable oil fuel.  this was the only mature technology. HEFA-SPK fuel is considered to be a leading alternative replacement for conventional jet fuel by the CAA. HEFA-SPK was approved by Altair Engineering for use in 2011. HEFA-SPK is produced by the deoxygenation and hydroprocessing of the feedstock fatty acids of algae, jatropha, and camelina.

 Bio-SPK 
 This fuel uses oil that is extracted from plant sources such as jatropha, algae, tallows, waste oils, babassu, and Camelina to produce synthetic paraffinic kerosene (bio-SPK) by cracking and hydroprocessing. Using algae to make jet fuel remains an emerging technology. Companies working on algae jet fuel include Solazyme, Honeywell UOP, Solena, Sapphire Energy, Imperium Renewables, and Aquaflow Bionomic Corporation. Universities working on algae jet fuel are Arizona State University and Cranfield University. Major investors for algae based SPK research are Boeing, Honeywell/UOP, Air New Zealand, Continental Airlines, Japan Airlines, and General Electric.

 FT-SPK 
 Another route involves processing solid biomass using pyrolysis to produce oil or gasification to produce a syngas that is processed into FT SPK (Fischer–Tropsch Synthetic Paraffinic Kerosene).

 ATJ-SPK 
 Alcohol-to-jet (ATJ) pathway takes alcohols such as ethanol or butanol and de-oxygenates and processes them into jet fuels. The ethanol is produced from CO in the flue gases using microbes such as Clostridium autoethanogenum. In 2016 LanzaTech demonstrated its technology at Pilot scale in NZ –using Industrial waste gases from the steel industry as a feedstock for its microbial fermentation. Gevo developed technology to retrofit existing ethanol plants to produce isobutanol. Alcohol-to-Jet Synthetic Paraffinic Kerosene (ATJ-SPK) is a proven pathway to deliver a bio-based, low-carbon option to travelers.

 Future production routes 
 Systems that use synthetic biology to create hydro-carbons are under development. The SUN-to-LIQUID project is examining Fischer-Tropsch hydro-carbon fuels (solar kerosine) through the use of a solar reactor. Alder Fuels raw material is waste from forestry and agriculture. This is mainly structural polymers cellulose, hemicellulose and lignin. They are processed via pyrolysis. The result is condensed into greencrude, a hydrocarbon-rich liquid, which is turned into fue in refineries.

 Piston engines
 Small piston engines can be modified to burn ethanol. Swift Fuel, a biofuel alternative to avgas, was approved as a test fuel by ASTM International in December 2009.

 Technical challenges
 Nitrile-based rubber materials expand in the presence of aromatic compounds found in conventional petroleum fuel. Pure biofuels that aren't mixed with petroleum and don't contain paraffin-based additives may cause rubber seals and hoses to shrink. Synthetic rubber substitutes that are not adversely affected by biofuels, such as Viton, for seals and hoses are available. The United States Air Force found harmful bacteria and fungi in their biofueled aircraft, and use pasteurization to disinfect them.

Economics
The International Energy Agency forecast SAF production should grow from 18 to 75 billion litres between 2025 and 2040, representing a share of aviation fuel getting from 5% to 19%.
By 2019, fossil jet fuel production cost was $0.3-0.6 per L given a $50–100 crude oil barrel, while aviation biofuel production cost was $0.7-1.6, needing a $110–260 crude oil barrel to break-even.

 aviation biofuel is more expensive than fossil jet kerosene, considering aviation taxation and subsidies at that time.

Sustainable aviation fuels

Sustainable biofuels do not use food crops, prime agricultural land or fresh water. Sustainable aviation fuel (SAF) is certified by a third-party such as the Roundtable For Sustainable Biofuels.

Sustainable fuels can be created with renewable energy without biomaterial. Hydrogen can be combusted or used in a fuel cell, although storage and transport remain challenging.

As of 2022, some 450,000 flights had used sustainable fuels in part, although such fuels were ~3x more expensive than the traditional fossil kerosene.

Certification
A sustainable aviation fuel (SAF) sustainability certification verifies that the product has satisfied criteria focused on environmental, social and economic "triple-bottom-line" considerations. Under many emission regulation schemes, such as the European Union Emissions Trading Scheme (EUTS), a certified SAF product may be exempted from carbon compliance liability costs. This marginally improves SAF's economic competitiveness over fossil-based fuel. However, commercialisation and regulatory hurdles remain to achieve price parity and to enable widespread uptake.

The first reputable body to launch a sustainable biofuel certification system was the European-based Roundtable on Sustainable Biomaterials (RSB) NGO. Leading airlines and other signatories to the Sustainable Aviation Fuel Users Group (SAFUG) pledged to support RSB as the preferred certification provider.

Criteria

 EU RED II Recast (2018) 
 Greenhouse gas emissions from sustainable fuels must be lower than those from the fuels they replace: at least 50% for production built prior to 5 October 2015, 60% after that date and 65% after 2021. Raw materials cannot be sourced from land with high biodiversity or high carbon stocks (i.e. primary and protected forests, biodiversity-rich grasslands, wetlands and peatlands). Other sustainability issues are set out in the Governance Regulation and may be covered on a voluntary basis.

 ICAO 'CORSIA'
 GHG Reduction - Criterion 1: lifecycle reductions of at least 10% compared to fossil fuel. Carbon Stock - Criterion 1: not produced from biomass obtained from land whose uses changed after 1 January 2008 from primeval forests, wetlands or peatlands, as all these lands have high carbon stocks. Criterion 2: For land use changes after 1 January 2008, (using IPCC land categories), if emissions from direct land use change (DLUC) exceed the default value of the induced land use change (ILUC), the value of the DLUC replaces the default (ILUC) value.

Global impact
As emissions trading schemes and other carbon compliance regimes emerge, certain biofuels are likely to be exempted ("zero rated") by governments from carbon compliance due to their closed-loop nature, if they can prove their wider sustainability credentials. For example, in the EUTS, SAFUG's proposal was accepted that only fuels certified as sustainable by the RSB or similar body would be zero rated. SAFUG was formed by a group of interested airlines in 2008 under the auspices of Boeing Commercial Airplanes. Member airlines represent more than 15% of the industry, and signed a pledge to work towards SAF.

In addition to SAF certification, the integrity of aviation biofuel producers and their product can be assessed by means such as Richard Branson's Carbon War Room, or the Renewable Jet Fuels initiative. The latter works with companies such as LanzaTech, SG Biofuels, AltAir, Solazyme, and Sapphire.

Along with her co-authors, Candelaria Bergero of the University of California's Earth System Science Department stated that "main challenges to scaling up such sustainable fuel production include technology costs and process efficiencies", and widespread production would undermine food security and land use.

Certified processes

See also 
 Biodiesel
 Fossil fuel phase-out
 List of emerging technologies
 Vegetable oil fuel

References

Further reading

External links
 
 
 
 
 
 
 

Algae biofuels
Aviation and the environment
Aviation fuels
Biofuels